The Paintbrush Canyon Trail is a  long hiking trail in Grand Teton National Park in the U.S. state of Wyoming. Access to the Paintbrush Canyon Trail is from the String Lake trailhead. From there the trail follows the west shore of String Lake and is also known as the String Lake Trail. The Paintbrush Canyon Trail then enters Paintbrush Canyon and becomes steeper and then splits with one trail heading to Holly Lake and the other heading south then west. The trails merge west of Holly Lake and it is a steady altitude gain the last  to Paintbrush Divide. The east approach to Paintbrush Divide is steep and may require the use of an ice axe through July. There are two camping zones within Paintbrush Canyon and one designated campsite at Holly Lake which are available with a permit.

See also
List of hiking trails in Grand Teton National Park

References

Hiking trails of Grand Teton National Park